The Gotham Independent Film Award for Breakthrough Nonfiction Series is one of the annual Gotham Independent Film Awards and was first awarded in 2021.

Winners and nominees

2020s

References

External links
 

Breakthrough Nonfiction Series
Awards established in 2021